Hybe (Hungarian: Hibbe) is a village and municipality in the Liptovský Mikuláš District in the Žilina Region of northern Slovakia.

Names and etymology
The name is of Slavic (Slovak) origin with uncertain etymology. Possibly, it derives from the stem -gyb/-hyb. Proto-Slavic gybij, gybkij, gybaja, gybica, Slovak hybký - unstable, flexible, the stem is present also in words like ohyb - bending, pohyb - movement, etc. The name may refer to the character of the river Hybica.

The name was adopted by the Germans before the lenition of Slavic /g/ to /h/ in Slovak ( 1200) - Geib.

History

The village of Hybe was first mentioned in historical records in 1239 (villa Hyba). The village was founded around the end of the 12th century, as a Slovak settlement. In 1230 the village was owned by Hauk, Polk and Beuch from Uhorská Ves. In 1239, King Béla IV of Hungary took possession and associated it with the royal property. In 1396, Hybe gives from monarch market liberties and toll-free. German Sasses (likely from neighbor Spiš) moved in during the first half of the 13th century.

In 1265 Hybe purchased the rights to become a mining city and citizens began mining gold on the base of the Mount Kriváň. The village sign depicts a miner and a hoe, and has been unchanged since then. Mining eventually proved unsustainable due to the poor gold lode and high expenses incurred due to the rough terrain. Some of the gold miners went to Bocianska dolina.

In 1390 Hybe became the property of the Liptov district administrator and become villein small town of domination in Liptovský Hrádok. Between the 14th and 15th centuries, mining gave way to farming and crafts.

Despite of villein ratio to Liptovský Hrádok, Hybe was an important farming and culture center of the top part of Liptov between the late-19th and mid-20th centuries. More than 20 kinds of crafts were in the village but the most widespread were builders, which became famous specialists at building of City of Budapest.

Modern day

Facilities in the village currently include an infant school, elementary school, palace of culture, Evangelic church, Roman Catholic Church, house of Dobroslav Chrobák and library. Both churches, memorable house of Dobroslav Chrobák, memorable house of poet Jakub Grajchman, grave of Jakub Grajchman with gravestone, memorable house of Alojz Štróbl are inhere in the Central list ancient monument foundation of Slovak Republic, on the list: Culture monuments. Entire center of village is promulgated for national culture treasure. On the present is on the village created strong sports background, local sportsmen get awards in the slovak competitions, primarily in the cross-country skiing. Hybe has very good conditions for winter sports, cyclo-tourism, tourism in Hybe gully or into mineral springs and for mushrooms. There is situated ski lift and certified racing track. In the village is a volunteer fireman brigade.

Hybe's school includes children from surrounding villages (Vyšná Boca, Nižná Boca, Kráľova Lehota, and Malužiná). The school has a well-equipped computer class as part of Slovakia's national Infovek project. Sports available include table tennis, badminton, football, and, in winter, hockey.

Notable residents

Today's citizens of Hybe take pride in their cultural history, on men of the day, which came from Hybe and prove competent in a number of areas social and cultural life of Slovak Republic. These include: writers Jakub Grajchman and Dobroslav Chrobák, writer and screenwriter Peter Jaroš, historian and writer Rudo Brtáň, poet Július Lenko, actors Ivan Rajniak, Ondrej Jariabek, Teodor Piovarči, Slavo Záhradník, director Ondrej Rajniak, director of amateur theatre Ruzena Jariabeková, academic painter Pavol Michalides, architects Ján Svetlík, Jozef Chrobák, Vladimir Chrobák, Ján Mlynár and many others.

Geography

The municipality lies at an altitude of 690 metres and covers an area of 52.866 km². It has a population of about 1600 people.
It lies in north part of Slovak Republic. It is situated in Liptov fold between High Tatras and Low Tatras, in valley of Hybica and White Váh.

Hybe in cinematography

Thanks to the works of the writer Peter Jaroš, Hybe has been depicted in Slovak cinematography.

Pacho the Brigand of Hybe (1975) 
From director Martin Ťapák (screenplay from Hybe's writer Peter Jaroš). This movie is about historical legend - brigand Pacho, who helped poor people and fight with poorness like Juraj Jánošík.

The Millennial Bee (1983) 
The saga about builder lineage of Pichandovci (by the novel of Peter Jaroš), which is located in a small village in years 1887–1917. This movie belongs between the best movie of central Europe. On movie works several important people from social and cultural life after 1968. Director Juraj Jakubisko, Screenwriter Peter Jaroš, Music - Petr Hapka and famous Slovak actors Michal Dočolomanský (as Valent Pichanda), Štefan Kvietik (as Samo Pichanda), Pavol Mikulík (as Julo Mitron) and the best slovak actor Academy Award winner (for The Shop on Main Street) Jozef Króner (as Martin Pichanda). The main part of movie was filmed in Hybe and supernumeraries are real citizens of Hybe.

Genealogical resources

The records for genealogical research are available at the state archive (Statny Archiv) in Bytca, Slovakia.

 Roman Catholic church records (births/marriages/deaths): 1675-1923 (parish A)
 Lutheran church records (births/marriages/deaths): 1731-1895 (parish A)

Gallery

Memory plates

See also
 List of municipalities and towns in Slovakia

References

External links

https://web.archive.org/web/20071027094149/http://www.statistics.sk/mosmis/eng/run.html

Surnames of living people in Hybe

Villages and municipalities in Liptovský Mikuláš District